A Habitual Criminals Act is an act where, after a certain number of convictions for certain crimes, dependent upon severity, a person is sentenced to an additional term ranging from a number of years to life imprisonment.

Example

The State of Washington defines its habitual criminals act as follows:

See also
Three strikes law
Habitual offender

References 

U.S. state criminal legislation